Euzopherodes is a genus of snout moths. It was described by George Hampson in 1899.

Species
 Euzopherodes albicans Hampson, 1899
 Euzopherodes albistrigella Hampson, 1908
 Euzopherodes allocrossa Lower, 1903
 Euzopherodes capicola Balinsky, 1994
 Euzopherodes charlottae Rebel, 1914
 Euzopherodes ephestialis Hampson, 1903
 Euzopherodes euphrontis (Meyrick, 1937)
 Euzopherodes homocapna Turner, 1947
 Euzopherodes keltella Amsel, 1935
 Euzopherodes lutisignella (Mann, 1869)
 Euzopherodes liturosella (Erschoff, 1874)
 Euzopherodes nipponensis Yamanaka, 2006
 Euzopherodes oberleae Roesler, 1973
 Euzopherodes pusilla Mabille, 1906
 Euzopherodes taprobalis Hampson, 1908
 Euzopherodes vapidella (Mann, 1857)

References

Phycitini
Pyralidae genera